Chip Forrester is the former chairman of the Tennessee Democratic Party. He served on the Tennessee State Democratic Committee from 1988 until 2009 when he was elected chairman. He is the son of a 35-year military veteran. He recently received news coverage after calling on representative Scott DesJarlais to resign.

References

Tennessee Democrats
Living people
Tennessee Democratic Party chairs
Year of birth missing (living people)